Martin Ruland the Younger (11 November 1569 – 23 April 1611), also known as Martinus Rulandus or Martin Rulandt, was a German physician and alchemist.

He was born in the Bavarian town of Lauingen, the son of the physician and alchemist Martin Ruland the Elder.

Ruland the Younger practiced at Regensburg during the 1590s and later at Prague. In Prague, he belonged to Emperor Rudolf II's retinue at the Habsburg court which during Rudolf's reign promoted the study of alchemy and astrology. Rudolf II conferred nobility upon Ruland the Younger in 1608.

Ruland's 1612 Lexicon alchemiae (Dictionary of Alchemy) is cited by the Swiss psychologist Carl Jung in his writings on alchemy. Waite translated the book into the English language.

Ruland the Younger was also the editor of his father's works.

Books 
 ("The True Method for Completing the Philosopher's Stone") (1606)
"Defence of Alchemy" (1607)
 (1607)
 ("Dictionary of Alchemy") (1612)

References 

1569 births
1611 deaths
People from Lauingen
16th-century German physicians
17th-century German physicians
German alchemists
17th-century German writers
17th-century German male writers
16th-century alchemists
17th-century alchemists